Always In Between is the second studio album by English singer Jess Glynne, released on 12 October 2018 by Atlantic Records. It debuted at number one on the UK Albums Chart and in the top forty of several other countries. It was Glynne's last album with Atlantic Records.

Background
Glynne announced Always In Between was to be released on 29 June 2018 along with a world tour of the same name. The album was supported by the UK number-one single "I'll Be There". It is Glynne's first studio album in three years since the release of her debut project in 2015, I Cry When I Laugh.

Critical reception

Always In Between received mixed reviews from music critics. At Metacritic, which assigns a normalized rating out of 100 to reviews from mainstream critics, the album has an average score of 60 out of 100 based on 4 reviews, indicating "mixed or average reviews". Alexis Petridis of The Guardian gave the album two stars out of five, calling it "generic Top 40 and soul-pop finished to a high standard". While noting that the album is "influenced by classic soul, heavy on the blaring brass – not so much Amy Winehouse as her less emotionally wrenching contemporary Joss Stone – and, at the other, undemanding dance-pop topped by an immediately recognisable voice, the same idea that garnered M People vast success 20 years ago", Petridis concluded that "[y]ou can see why people relate to it, you can tell it's going to be huge: it is what pop is in 2018, but the feeling that pop can be something rather more than this is hard to shake." Will Hodgkinson of The Times gave the album the same rating, comparing tracks "No One" and "Broken" and their "teary verses and swelling choruses" to Adele but said the tracks "lack Adele's ability to evoke real feeling". He ultimately called the album "missing any real sense of character or expression." In a more positive review, Maura Johnston, writing for Rolling Stone, said "she’s once again bridging the gap between bouncy pop-EDM and feisty soul, shaking off the malaise that’s struck too many of her playlisted peers in a way that lets Glynne serve as a one-woman rooting crew for herself and, by extension, anyone in need of a peppy pick-me-up" and gave the album three and a half stars.

Commercial performance
In the United Kingdom, Always In Between debuted at number one on the UK Albums Chart, selling 36,500 album-equivalent units during its first week of release, with a total of 24,820 physical sales (67% of overall units). In doing so, she scored her second UK number-one album, while also becoming the first British female artist to achieve a number-one album in the country in 2018.

Track listing

Personnel

Credits from AllMusic.

 Jess Glynne – vocals
 Knox Brown – sampled vocals, keyboard, drums
 Teniola Abosede – backing vocals
 Angel Williams-Silvera – backing vocals
 Jesse Appiah – backing vocals
 Paul Burton – trombone
 Kenji Fénton – saxophone
 Mike Davis – flugelhorn
 Toby Gad – guitar, bass, piano
 Gregori Hofmann - Bass

Charts

Weekly charts

Year-end charts

Certifications

References

2018 albums
Jess Glynne albums
Atlantic Records albums
Albums produced by Louis Bell
Albums produced by Toby Gad
Albums produced by Steve Mac